Darrell Wright (born December 30, 1979) is an American football defensive lineman. He plays for South Valley Vandals in the NNFL.

Wright played college football for the University of Oregon. In 2006, he attended training camp with the Houston Texans of the National Football League and played in NFL Europa for the Cologne Centurions.

External links
Orlando Predators player bio
Oregon Defensive Anchor, 2002 Fiesta Bowl Champ

1979 births
Living people
American football defensive linemen
Oregon Ducks football players
Houston Texans players
Cologne Centurions (NFL Europe) players
Orlando Predators players